Crawford Valley is a valley which is ice free except at the headwall, lying between Deshler Valley and Bowser Valley in the Saint Johns Range of Victoria Land. Named by the Advisory Committee on Antarctic Names in 2005 after photographer Neelon Crawford, a participant in the National Science Foundation’s Antarctic Artists and Writers Program for five field seasons, from 1989 to 1994.

References

Valleys of Victoria Land